Scrobipalpa aulorrhoa is a moth in the family Gelechiidae. It was described by Edward Meyrick in 1935. It is found in Argentina.

References

Scrobipalpa
Moths described in 1935